Franklyn Benjamin Gracesqui (born August 20, 1979) is a former left-handed professional baseball pitcher.

Gracesqui was drafted in the 21st round of the 1998 Major League Baseball Draft by the Toronto Blue Jays. Gracesqui became a free agent after the  season and signed a minor league contract with the Baltimore Orioles. In 17 relief appearances, Gracesqui had a 3–0 record and an ERA of 2.35. He became a free agent at the end of the season. Gracesqui pitched for the York Revolution and Laredo Broncos in 2010. He reported to spring training with the Yuma Scorpions on May 14, 2011. He played briefly for the Bridgeport Bluefish of the Atlantic League of Professional Baseball in 2012, but was released.

External links

1979 births
Living people
Albuquerque Isotopes players
Bridgeport Bluefish players
Carolina Mudcats players
Chunichi Dragons players
Dominican Republic expatriate baseball players in Canada
Dominican Republic expatriate baseball players in Japan
Dominican Republic expatriate baseball players in the United States
Dunedin Blue Jays players
Florida Marlins players
Gulf Coast Marlins players
Hagerstown Suns players
Laredo Broncos players

Major League Baseball pitchers
Major League Baseball players from the Dominican Republic
Newark Bears players
Ottawa Lynx players
Southern Maryland Blue Crabs players
Sportspeople from Santo Domingo
Tennessee Smokies players
York Revolution players
Yuma Scorpions players